Shearwaters are medium-sized long-winged seabirds in the petrel family Procellariidae. They have a global marine distribution, but are most common in temperate and cold waters, and are pelagic outside the breeding season.

Description
These tubenose birds fly with stiff wings and use a "shearing" flight technique (flying very close to the water and seemingly cutting or "shearing" the tips of waves) to move across wave fronts with the minimum of active flight. This technique gives the group its English name. Some small species, like the Manx shearwater are cruciform in flight, with their long wings held directly out from their bodies.

Behaviour

Movements
One study found Sooty shearwaters migrating nearly  a year, which would give them the longest animal migration ever recorded electronically. Short-tailed shearwaters perform an even longer "figure of eight" loop migration in the Pacific Ocean from Tasmania to as far north as the Arctic Ocean off northwest Alaska. They are long-lived. A Manx shearwater breeding on Copeland Island, Northern Ireland, was (as of 2003/2004) the oldest known wild bird in the world: ringed as an adult (when at least 5 years old) in July 1953, it was retrapped in July 2003, at least 55 years old.

Following the tracks of the migratory Yelkouan shearwater has revealed that this species never flies overland, even if it means flying an extra 1'000 km. For instance, during their seasonal migration towards the Black Sea they would circumvent the entire Peloponnese instead of crossing over the 6 km isthmus of Corinth.

Breeding
Shearwaters come to islands and coastal cliffs only to breed. They are nocturnal at the colonial breeding sites, preferring moonless nights to minimize predation. They nest in burrows and often give eerie contact calls on their night-time visits. They lay a single white egg. The chicks of some species, notably short-tailed and sooty shearwaters, are subject to harvesting from their nest burrows for food, a practice known as muttonbirding, in Australia and New Zealand.

Feeding
They feed on fish, squid, and similar oceanic food. Some will follow fishing boats to take scraps, commonly the sooty shearwater; these species also commonly follow whales to feed on fish disturbed by them.

Taxonomy
There are about 30 species: a few larger ones in the genera Calonectris and Ardenna and many smaller ones in Puffinus. Recent genomic studies show that Shearwaters form a clade with Procellaria, Bulweria and Pseudobulweria. This arrangement contrasts with earlier conceptions based on mitochondrial DNA sequencing.

List of species
The group contains 3 genera with 32 species.
 Puffinus
 Christmas shearwater, Puffinus nativatis
 Manx shearwater, Puffinus puffinus
 Yelkouan shearwater, Puffinus yelkouan
 Balearic shearwater, Puffinus mauretanicus
 Bryan's shearwater, Puffinus bryani – first described in 2011
 Black-vented shearwater, Puffinus opisthomelas
 Townsend's shearwater, Puffinus auriculatus
 Newell's shearwater, Puffinus  newelli (split from Townsend's shearwater)
 Rapa shearwater, Puffinus myrtae (split from Newell's shearwater)
 Fluttering shearwater, Puffinus gavia
 Hutton's shearwater, Puffinus huttoni
 Audubon's shearwater, Puffinus lherminieri
 Persian shearwater, Puffinus persicus (split from Audubon's shearwater)
 Tropical shearwater, Puffinus bailloni (split from Audubon's shearwater)
 Galápagos shearwater, Puffinus subalaris (split from Audubon's shearwater)
 Bannerman's shearwater, Puffinus bannermani
 Heinroth's shearwater,  Puffinus heinrothi
 Little shearwater, Puffinus assimilis
 Subantarctic shearwater, Puffinus elegans (split from little shearwater)
 Barolo shearwater or Macronesian shearwater, Puffinus baroli
 Boyd's shearwater, Puffinus boydi (split from Barolo shearwater)
 Calonectris
 Streaked shearwater, Calonectris leucomelas
 Scopoli's shearwater, Calonectris diomedea (split from Cory's shearwater)
 Cory's shearwater, Calonectris diomedea 
 Cape Verde shearwater, Calonectris edwardsii 
 Ardenna
 Wedge-tailed shearwater, Ardenna pacifica
 Buller's shearwater, Ardenna bulleri 
 Sooty shearwater, Ardenna grisea 
 Short-tailed shearwater or mutton bird, Ardenna tenuirostris 
 Pink-footed shearwater, Ardenna creatopus 
 Flesh-footed shearwater, Ardenna carneipes 
 Great shearwater, Ardenna gravis

There are two extinct species that have been described from fossils.
 † Lava shearwater or Olson's shearwater, Puffinus olsoni
 † Dune shearwater or Hole's shearwater, Puffinus holeae

Phylogeny
Phylogeny of the shearwaters based on a study by Joan Ferrer Obiol and collaborators published in 2022. Only 14 of the 21 recognised species in the genus Puffinus were included.

References

External links
Shearwater videos on the Internet Bird Collection

Seabirds
Bird common names